Azusa (梓, あづさ, あずさ, アズサ) is a Japanese feminine given name, literally meaning "catalpa" among other senses (other trees, and objects made from this wood). Notable people with the name include:

, Japanese voice actor 
, Japanese singer  
, Japanese actress and voice actress 
, Japanese model
, Japanese association footballer
, Japanese tarento and model
, Japanese voice actress
, Japanese ice hockey goaltender
, Japanese science fiction writer 
, Japanese marathon runner
, Japanese intellectual
, Japanese singer
, Japanese long-distance runner
, Japanese voice actress
, Japanese gravure idol
, Japanese actress
, Japanese gravure idol, actress and television personality
Azusa Yamauchi (born 1998), Japanese archer

Fictional characters
, a character from The Idolmaster
, a character from Case Closed
, a character from Big Windup!
, the main character from The "Hentai" Prince and the Stony Cat.
, a character from Starry Sky
, a main character from K-On!
, a character from Diabolik Lovers
, a character from The Irregular at Magic High School
, a character from Brothers Conflict
, a character from Grand Blue
, one of the supporting protagonists from Girls und Panzer
, a character from Master of Martial Hearts
, a character from Soul Eater
, a character from Great Teacher Onizuka

Japanese feminine given names